In the UEFA European Championship, the following male players have been named in the national team in at least four finals tournaments.

Most tournaments

Sources:

Most matches
The following players have played at least fifteen matches, which requires appearances in a minimum of three European Championship tournaments.

Sources:

References
 

Multiple appearances
Euro appearances